Helen Ann Davies (born 29 July 1966) is a South African former cricketer who played as a right-handed batter and right-arm medium bowler. She appeared in 25 One Day Internationals for South Africa between 1997 and 2000. She played domestic cricket for Western Province.

References

External links
 
 

1966 births
Living people
Cricketers from Cape Town
South African women cricketers
South Africa women One Day International cricketers
Western Province women cricketers
20th-century South African women
21st-century South African women